This is a list of gamelan varieties.

Javanese gamelan varieties
Gamelan Kodok Ngorek
Gamelan Munggang
Gamelan Sekaten
Gamelan Carabalen
Gamelan gadhon
Gamelan siteran
Gamelan wayangan
Bamboo gamelan
Gamelan prawa
Gamelan pelog
Gamelan Renteng
Gamelan Sekati
Gamelan Degung
Gamelan kedempling
Gamelan Banyuwangi
Gamelan Madura

Balinese gamelan varieties
Gamelan angklung 
Gamelan batel
Gamelan bebonangan
Gamelan beleganjur
Gamelan gambang
Gamelan gambuh
Gamelan gandrung
Gamelan gender wayang
Gamelan gong gede
Gamelan gong kebyar
Gamelan gong luang
Gamelan gong saron
Gamelan gong suling
Gamelan jegog
Gamelan joged bumbung
Gamelan pearjaan
Gamelan pelegongan
Gamelan selunding
Gamelan semar pegulingan
Gamelan semarandana
Gamelan trompong beruk
Gamelan tembang girang

Sundanese Gamelan Varieties
Gamelan Degung
Gamelan Jaipongan
Gamelan Kliningan
Gamelan Salendro 
Gamelan Kecapi suling
Gamelan Tembang sunda

See also 

 Gamelan
 Music of Indonesia
 Music of Java
 Music of Bali

Gamelan ensembles and genres
Gamelan
Gamelan
Music of Bali
Sundanese music
Gamelan